HMS Jackal was an  of the Royal Navy that served during the World War I and was sold for breaking in 1920. She was the seventh Royal Navy ship to be named Jackal, after the predatory mammal of the same name.

Construction
She was built under the 1910-11 shipbuilding programme by R. W. Hawthorn Leslie & Company of Hebburn, Tyneside to an Admiralty design and was launched on 9 September 1911.

Career

Pre-War
Jackal served with the First Destroyer Flotilla from 1911 and, with her flotilla, joined the British Grand Fleet in 1914 on the outbreak of the First World War.

The Battle of Heligoland Bight
She was present on 28 August 1914 at the Battle of Heligoland Bight, detached from the First Destroyer Flotilla along with Badger, Beaver and Sandfly. She shared in the prize money for the engagement.

The Battle of Dogger Bank
On 24 January 1915, the First Destroyer Flotilla — including Jackal — were present at the Battle of Dogger Bank, led by the light cruiser . Her crew shared in the prize money for the German armoured cruiser .

Grounding of Argyll
The light cruiser  went aground on Bell Rock near Dundee on 28 October after failing to sight the light due to a failure of communications between the ship and the lighthouse.

SS Lanfranc
At the time, she had 387 patients, of which 167 were German prisoners of war, and of these patients, 326 were cot-bound.

Mediterranean Service
In 1917, the Third Battle Squadron was sent to the Mediterranean, where they took part in the 1918 Naval campaign in the Adriatic, including enforcing the Otranto Barrage.

Jackal and Hornet encountered the Austro-Hungarian ships and turned towards, making the challenge signal. At a range of  the Austro-Hungarian destroyers opened fire, concentrating their fire on Hornet. Both British ships turned away, making smoke, with the intention of drawing the enemy south, but Hornet took a hit in the forward shell room and magazine, starting fires in both compartments and causing an explosion. The bridge and tiller flat both received further hits, and the rudder jammed hard over to starboard, leaving the ship circling hard under fire. Jackal was turned to the east by her captain — Lieutenant-Commander A M Roberts — but after approximately 15 minutes of firing, Herkner in Triglav broke off the engagement, reasoning that the alarm had certainly been raised. Jackal continued the pursuit, but the faster Austro-Hungarians pulled ahead, and she lost sight of them by 00:20. Alarm, Torrens and Cimeterre had caught up with Jackal by 00:45, but by 01:35 the pursuit was called off.

Hornet was seriously damaged, and Jackal had lost her mainmast, but the appearance of Allied reinforcements had driven the Austrians back to Cattaro (now Kotor in Montenegro). The British lost seven killed (including two in Jackal) and 25 wounded, while the Austro-Hungarians suffered no hits. Despite the one-sided casualty figures, two pre-war Royal Navy destroyers had succeeded in driving off five of the latest enemy destroyers.

Jackal was present at the entry of the Allied Fleet through the Dardanelles on 12 November. The Fleet sighted the minarets of Constantinople at 07:00 on 13 November and anchored an hour later. The destroyers maintained an anti-submarine patrol to the west of the anchored fleet.

Disposal

Along with most ships of her class, she was laid up after the war, and on 28 September 1920 she was sold to J Smith for breaking.

Pennant numbers

References

Acheron-class destroyers of the Royal Navy
Ships built on the River Tyne
1911 ships
World War I destroyers of the United Kingdom